The Roman Catholic Archdiocese of Mansa is a suffragan diocese in the city of Mansa in the ecclesiastical province of Kasama in Zambia.

History
 July 10, 1952: Established as Apostolic Prefecture of Fort Rosebery from the Apostolic Vicariate of Bangueolo
 January 3, 1961: Promoted as Diocese of Fort Rosebery 
 November 22, 1967: Renamed as Diocese of Mansa

Bishops
 Prefect Apostolic of Fort Rosebery (Roman rite) 
 Fr. René-Georges Pailloux, M. Afr. (1952.11.07 – 1961.01.03 see below)
 Bishop of Fort Rosebery (Roman rite) 
 Bishop René-Georges Pailloux, M. Afr. (see above 1961.01.03 – 1967.11.22 see below)
 Bishops of Mansa (Latin Church)
 Bishop René-Georges Pailloux, M. Afr. (see above 1967.11.22 – 1971.07.03)
 Bishop Elias White Mutale (1971.07.03 – 1973.09.17), appointed Archbishop of Kasama
 Bishop James Mwewa Spaita (1974.02.28 – 1990.12.03), appointed Archbishop of Kasama
 Bishop Andrew Aaron Chisha (1993.07.01 - 2009.01.15)
 Bishop Patrick Chilekwa Chisanga, O.F.M. Conv. (2013.11.30 - )

Auxiliary Bishop
Clemens P. Chabukasansha (1963-1965), appointed Bishop of Kasama

Other priest of this diocese who became bishop
Ignatius Chama, appointed Bishop of Mpika in 2008

See also
Roman Catholicism in Zambia

References
 GCatholic.org
 Catholic Hierarchy

Roman Catholic dioceses in Zambia
Christian organizations established in 1952
Roman Catholic dioceses and prelatures established in the 20th century
1952 establishments in the British Empire
Roman Catholic Ecclesiastical Province of Kasama